The Bamboo Woolly Aphid, (Pseudoregma bambucicola), is an aphid in the superfamily Aphidoidea in the order Hemiptera. It is a true bug and sucks sap from plants.

References

External links 

 http://www.nbair.res.in/Aphids/Pseudoregma-bambucicola.php
 https://www.researchgate.net/publication/230369543_Four_Novel_Glycosides_from_the_Aphid_Pseudoregma_bambmicola_T
 http://www.cabdirect.org/abstracts/19921162393.html
 http://aphid.speciesfile.org/Common/basic/Taxa.aspx?TaxonNameID=1162589

Hormaphidinae
Agricultural pest insects